Vital Shapyatowski (born 27 September 1983) is a Belarusian former professional footballer.

Career

Club
In January 2011, he joined Olimpia Elbląg on a one-year contract.

References

External links
 
 
 

1983 births
Living people
Belarusian footballers
Belarusian expatriate footballers
Expatriate footballers in Ukraine
Expatriate footballers in Poland
Belarusian expatriate sportspeople in Poland
FC Traktor Minsk players
FC Dinamo Minsk players
FC Kommunalnik Slonim players
FC SKVICH Minsk players
FC Partizan Minsk players
FC Torpedo Minsk players
FC Energetik-BGU Minsk players
FC Darida Minsk Raion players
FC Kryvbas Kryvyi Rih players
FC Neman Grodno players
FC Smorgon players
FC Gorodeya players
Olimpia Elbląg players
FC Krumkachy Minsk players
FC Isloch Minsk Raion players
FC Luch Minsk (2012) players
Association football midfielders